Sonic Highways is a 2014 American documentary miniseries directed by Dave Grohl and written by Mark Monroe. The documentary was made concurrently with Foo Fighters' eighth album, Sonic Highways, and was broadcast on HBO. Grohl described the project as "a love letter to the history of American music". Each of the eight episodes is presented as an exploration of the musical history of a different American city through a series of interviews by Grohl. The group is also shown incorporating what they learned from the interviews into the writing and recording of a new song in or near that city. The series debuted on October 17, 2014.

Development
After the success of Grohl's 2013 documentary film Sound City, he expressed interest to Billboard of doing something similar.  According to Grohl,

On May 15, 2014, it was announced that the Foo Fighters' eighth album would be released in the fall of 2014, and that the band would commemorate the album and their 20th anniversary with the TV series.  Each song on the new album was recorded in a different city, featuring “local legends” on each song and lyrics inspired by the ”experiences, interviews and personalities that became part of the process.”

On May 31, 2014, a 20-second video was uploaded to YouTube announcing the series. On August 21, 2014, a trailer, lasting 3 minutes and 31 seconds, was uploaded to YouTube showing most of the people interviewed in the series.

Overview
The series eight episodes show the Foo Fighters traveling to eight legendary studios in eight different cities across the United States of America to write and record their album, Sonic Highways.  The cities visited were Chicago, Washington, D.C., Nashville, Austin, Los Angeles, New Orleans, Seattle and New York.  Studios involved with the project include Steve Albini's Electrical Audio in Chicago; Rancho De La Luna in California; Robert Lang Studios in Seattle, and Arlington County, Virginia's Inner Ear Studios.

Each episode features interviews with artists who recorded at the respective studios. Among them are Dolly Parton, Daniel Lanois, Ian MacKaye of Minor Threat and Fugazi, Paul Stanley of Kiss, Joe Walsh of Eagles, Duff McKagan of Guns N' Roses, Nancy Wilson of Heart, Rick Nielsen of Cheap Trick, Zac Brown, and Gary Clark, Jr.  There was also collaboration with the Preservation Hall Jazz Band in New Orleans, which led to a live performance with Trombone Shorty. The episodes begin with a quote from a song that was recorded in their respective location and ends with a music video for that same song with animated lyrics appearing in the background.

Surprise concerts
On May 5, 2014, Foo Fighters gave a surprise two-hour concert at 9:30 Club in  Washington D.C.

On May 7, 2014, Grohl performed a surprise hour-long solo set at The Bluebird Cafe in Nashville to a crowd of approximately 100 people.

On May 17, 2014, after a week of recording at Preservation Hall, the band played a surprise show for 90-minutes, which proceeded to shut down an entire block of St. Peter Street in New Orleans.

International broadcast
The series aired in the UK on BBC Four starting October 26, 2014. It also aired in Australia on GO! hours after its US broadcast. It was repeated on Channel [V] from February 16, 2015.

Episodes

Charts

Certifications

See also
 Foo Fighters: Back and Forth

References

External links
 
 Official Sonic Highways: Announcement Teaser

Works by Dave Grohl
2010s American documentary television series
Documentary television series about music
Rockumentaries
2014 American television series debuts
2014 American television series endings
2010s American television miniseries
HBO original programming
HBO documentary films
Television series by Worldwide Pants
Foo Fighters